Əmili or Emili or Amili may refer to:
Böyük Əmili, Azerbaijan
Kiçik Əmili, Azerbaijan
 Al-'Amili